Stephen Thraves is a British children's author. The author of over 200 books, he is the creator of Fetch the Vet, a 26 episode animation for pre-school which aired on ITV between 1999 and 2001. He also wrote eight Famous Five adventure game books based on Enid Blyton's major series, published by Hodder & Stoughton in the 1980s. The first adventure game book of the series, The Wreckers' Tower Game, was published in October 1984.

References

External links

Official site

British children's writers
Living people
Year of birth missing (living people)
Place of birth missing (living people)